Events from the year 1805 in Germany.

Incumbents

Holy Roman Empire 
 Francis II (5 July 17926 August 1806)

Important Electors
Baden- Charles Frederick (27 April 18036 August 1806)
Bavaria- Maximilian I (16 February 17996 August 1806)
Saxony- Frederick Augustus I (17 December 176320 December 1806)
 Würzburg- Ferdinand III (25 December 18056 August 1806)
Württemberg - Frederick I (180330 October 1816)

Kingdoms 
 Kingdom of Prussia
 Monarch – Frederick William III of Prussia (16 November 17977 June 1840)

Grand Duchies 
 Grand Duke of Mecklenburg-Schwerin
 Frederick Francis I (24 April 17851 February 1837)
 Grand Duke of Mecklenburg-Strelitz
 Charles II (2 June 17946 November 1816)
 Grand Duke of Oldenburg
 Wilhelm (6 July 17852 July 1823) Due to mental illness, Wilhelm was duke in name only, with his cousin Peter, Prince-Bishop of Lübeck, acting as regent throughout his entire reign.
 Peter I (2 July 182321 May 1829)
 Grand Duke of Saxe-Weimar
 Karl August  (1758–1809) Raised to grand duchy in 1809

Principalities 
 Schaumburg-Lippe
 George William (13 February 17871860)
 Schwarzburg-Rudolstadt
 Louis Frederick II (13 April 179328 April 1807)
 Schwarzburg-Sondershausen
 Günther Friedrich Karl I (14 October 179419 August 1835)
 Principality of Lippe
 Leopold II (5 November 18021 January 1851)
 Principality of Reuss-Greiz
 Heinrich XIII (28 June 180029 January 1817)
 Waldeck and Pyrmont
 Friedrich Karl August  (29 August 176324 September 1812)

Duchies 
 Duke of Anhalt-Dessau
 Leopold III (16 December 17519 August 1817)
 Duke of Saxe-Altenburg
 Duke of Saxe-Hildburghausen (1780–1826)  - Frederick
 Duke of Saxe-Coburg-Saalfeld
Francis (8 September 18009 December 1806)
 Duke of Saxe-Meiningen
 Bernhard II (24 December 180320 September 1866)
 Duke of Schleswig-Holstein-Sonderburg-Beck
 Frederick Charles Louis (24 February 177525 March 1816)

Other

 Landgrave of Hesse-Darmstadt
 Louis I (6 April 179014 August 1806)

Events 
 7 April – Beethoven's Symphony No. 3, Eroica, has its public premiere at the Theater an der Wien in Vienna under his baton.
 9 April - The first Weltsekttag to celebrate the resistance to Napoleon. 
 8 October –  Battle of Wertingen
 9 October – Battle of Günzburg
 11 October  – Battle of Haslach-Jungingen
 14 October – Napoleonic Wars: War of the Third Coalition – Ulm Campaign: Battle of Elchingen – An Austrian corps under Johann von Riesch is defeated by Marshal Ney, near Elchingen, Bavaria.
 16–19 October – War of the Third Coalition: Ulm Campaign – Battle of Ulm: Austrian General Mack von Leiberich is forced to surrender his entire army to Napoleon, after being surrounded.
 3 November – Treaty of Potsdam
 20 November – Beethoven's only opera Fidelio, in its original form (known retrospectively as Leonore), is premiered at the Theater an der Wien in Vienna, which at this time is under French military occupation.
 Grand Duchy of Würzburg is established.

Births 

 27 January – Samuel Palmer, English artist (died 1881)
 13 February – Peter Gustav Lejeune Dirichlet, German mathematician (died 1859)
 8 April – Hugo von Mohl, German botanist (died 1872)

 30 July – Rudolf Wagner, German anatomist, pathologist (died 1864)
 27 September – George Müller, Prussian evangelist, founder of the New Orphan Houses, Ashley Down, Bristol in England (died 1898)
 14 November – Fanny Mendelssohn, German composer, pianist (died 1847)

Deaths 

 17 January – Paschen von Cossel, German lawyer (born 1714)
 20 February – Justus Claproth, German jurist, inventor of the de-inking process of recycled paper (born 1728)
 9 May – Friedrich Schiller, German playwright (born 1759)

 5 October - Eleonore Prochaska, German heroine soldier (born 1785)

References 

Years of the 19th century in Germany
 
Germany
Germany